Umar Kayam (30 April 1932 – 16 March 2002) was an Indonesian sociologist and writer.

Biography
He began his education at the Hollandsch-Inlandsche School (HIS) in Surakarta, where his father also taught. He continued his education at a MULO (Meer Uitgebreid Lager Onderwijs), then continued studying language at a high school in Yogyakarta until 1951. He graduated from the Faculty of Education at Gadjah Mada University in 1955, received a M.A. from New York University in 1963, and was awarded his  Ph.D. from Cornell University in 1965.

He served as a director for the Social Studies Training Centre at the Hasanuddin University in Makassar (1975–1976) and as a member of the MPRS (People's Consultative Assembly). He was a lecturer at the University of Indonesia and a senior fellow at the East-West Center in Honolulu (1973). He was a chairman of the National Film Council, a senior professor in the Faculty of Letters at the Gadjah Mada University and an emeritus professor at that same university until his death.

Umar Kayam was an innovator in many aspects of his life. When he was a student at Gadjah Mada University, he was one of the founders of the  campus theater.
When he was the general director of radio and television, he was credited with helping to make the Indonesian film industry competitive. As the chairman of the Jakarta Arts Council (1969–1972), he was known for conducting meetings that addressed modern art and traditional art forms. He developed a sociological study of Indonesian literature and introduced the "grounded theory" to Indonesian social research. All of this provided  inspiration for the emergence of new creative works in the fields of literature, art and art performances, among other things.

He was the author of many short stories, novels, essays and children's stories, of which many are available in English. In 1987 he won the S.E.A. Write Award.

Personal life 
Kayam was married to his wife, former Femina journalist Yus Kayam, until his death. Yus survived him until her death in Jakarta on 3 August 2021. Nino Kayam, singer and songwriter known for his work with pop group RAN, is his grandson.

Publications

 

 Won the prize Yayasan Buku Utama Department of Education and Health, in 1995)
 

 Eneste, Pamusuk (2001). Buku pintar sastra Indonesia : biografi pengarang dan karyanya, majalah sastra, penerbit sastra, penerjemah, lembaga sastra, daftar hadiah dan penghargaan. Jakarta: Penerbit Buku Kompas halaman 249. .

References

External links
 Umar Kayam
 Alasan Umar Kayam Mau Jadi Soekarno
Umar Kayam's Books
 Prtal Resmi Provinsi DKI Jakarta

Indonesian sociologists
People from Ngawi Regency
Indonesian writers
1932 births
2002 deaths
Gadjah Mada University alumni